The Wuling Hongguang is a compact MPV produced since September 2010 by SAIC-GM-Wuling. Between 2013 and 2017, it was marketed as Chevrolet Enjoy in India by GM India.



First generation (2010)

The first generation Wuling Hongguang or Wuling Hongguang S compact MPV was launched in 2010, and several variants have spawned using the same platform including the Wuling Hongguang S1, Wuling Hongguang S3, Wuling Rongguang, and Wuling Rongguang V. It was reported that the Hongguang was the best selling vehicle in China during the first four months of 2014.

In 2013, the Chevrolet Enjoy contains 80% Indian parts.

Wuling Hongguang S

In August 2013, Wuling launched the Wuling Hongguang S, presenting them not in centers like Shanghai or Beijing, but in the two second-tier cities Harbin in the North-East and Kunming in the South-Western province of Yunnan. The Hongguang S is available with the 1.2 litre LMU and later the LMH and 1.5 litre L2B engine paired to a 5 speed manual gearbox. Three trim levels were offered, which are 1.2 L manual Basic, 1.5 L manual Basic and 1.5 L manual Standard. The Hongguang S is available with 5, 7 or 8 seater configurations. It is still available for purchase on the SAIC-GM-Wuling website as of 2019 as the Hongguang S Classic.

Wuling Hongguang V

A redesigned version of the van called Wuling Hongguang V was launched previously, and later was renamed to Wuling Rongguang V to be sold under the Wuling Rongguang series.

Safety 
The Chevrolet Enjoy for India with no airbags and no ABS received 0 stars for adult occupants and 2 stars for toddlers from Global NCAP in 2017 (similar to Latin NCAP 2013).

Second generation (2018)

The second generation Wuling Hongguang S was launched in 2018, and marketed as Xin Hongguang, meaning "New Hongguang". While the first generation Wuling Hongguang S was sold alongside as the Wuling Hongguang S Classic, the entry version of the Wuling Hongguang was simply discontinued

The second generation Hongguang uses the 1.5 litre L2B that is also found in the first generation Hongguang and uses a 5-speed manual gearbox like its predecessor. Three trim levels are available for the second generation Hongguang and are known as: Basic, Standard and Comfort. Compared to its predecessor, the second generation Hongguang S is 20 millimetres longer, narrower and taller and has the same 2,720 mm wheelbase.

Other versions

Wuling Hongguang S1 

The Wuling Hongguang S1 is an upmarket version of the Hongguang MPV line that was produced between 2015 and 2017 in China, and from 2017 to date in Indonesia as the Wuling Confero and Wuling Formo.

Wuling Hongguang S3 

The Wuling Hongguang S3 is a crossover SUV based on the Hongguang MPV platform produced since 2017.

Wuling Hongguang Plus

A larger and more upmarket variant based on a different platform was revealed in 2019 called the Wuling Hongguang Plus, featuring different exterior and interior designs.

References

External links

Official website

Hongguang S
Rear-wheel-drive vehicles
Compact MPVs
Global NCAP small MPVs
Cars introduced in 2010
2010s cars
Cars of China